Protazteca is an extinct genus of ants in the subfamily Dolichoderinae, that were endemic to the United States, which was described by Carpenter in 1930.

Species
There are currently 5 fossil species.
Protazteca capitata Carpenter, 1930
Protazteca eocenica Lapolla & Greenwalt, 2015
Protazteca elongata Carpenter, 1930
Protazteca hendersoni (Cockerell, 1906)
Protazteca quadrata Carpenter, 1930

References

†
Oligocene insects
Hymenoptera of North America
Fossil taxa described in 1930
Fossil ant genera